Alak is a rural locality (a selo) in Botlikhsky District, Republic of Dagestan, Russia. The population was 2,764 as of 2010. There are 32 streets.

Geography 
Alak is located 14 km southwest of Botlikh (the district's administrative centre) by road. Kheleturi is the nearest rural locality.

References 

Rural localities in Botlikhsky District